The Churchill Theatre–Community Building is a historic movie theater located at Church Hill, Queen Anne's County, Maryland, United States. It is a large two-story stucco building constructed in 1929 by the town government as a community hall, and was first used as a movie theatre in 1936. The present Art Deco entrance and interior features were installed after a fire in 1944. It continued to serve as a movie theater until 1982.

The Churchill Theatre–Community Building was listed on the National Register of Historic Places in 2000.

References

External links

, including undated photo, at Maryland Historical Trust

Theatres in Maryland
Buildings and structures in Queen Anne's County, Maryland
Theatres on the National Register of Historic Places in Maryland
Theatres completed in 1929
Art Deco architecture in Maryland
National Register of Historic Places in Queen Anne's County, Maryland